Leptocyrtinus similis is a species of beetle in the family Cerambycidae. It was described by Stephan von Breuning in 1948. It is known from Vanuatu.

References

Cyrtinini
Beetles described in 1948